Box Clever was a television game show from the United Kingdom that was presented by Emlyn Hughes. The programme was part of the then new daytime service by BBC Television and was broadcast on Fridays at 3.25pm. The show lasted for just one series, which aired from October 1986 to May 1987.

Format
Two families consisting of three members played a strategic board game with the moves dependent on correct answers to a wide variety of questions put by Dr. Sue Kingsman of Trinity College, Oxford. The winners then went on to play a computer game for prizes. The prize consisted of record and book tokens, and the winning family then took on new opponents until they were beaten.

The series was won by the Chiappino family from Southampton. Mark, the youngest Chiappino, later appeared as a regular on BBC One’s Claimed and Shamed.

References

External links

 

1980s British game shows
1986 British television series debuts
1987 British television series endings
BBC television game shows